Michele La Spina (Acireale, 1849 - Rome, 1943) was an Italian sculptor.

He was born at Arcireale, Sicily, but worked mostly in Rome. He completed various statuary concepts. Among his works are a Faun making a flute (exhibited in Rome in 1883); a portrait of Lionardo Vigo, cast in bronze by the Nelly Foundry; and a statue of a Dog. He was also active in Florence and Naples. He completed a colossal Bust of Garibaldi in Stucco, exhibited at the Pinacoteca Zelantea and a Monument to the Fallen  (Monumento dei Caduti) 1929 in piazza Garibaldi of Acireale. The statue of Caduti was controversial due to the nudity of the standing figure.

References

1849 births
1943 deaths
People from Acireale
20th-century Italian sculptors
20th-century Italian male artists
19th-century Italian sculptors
Italian male sculptors
Artists from Sicily
19th-century Italian male artists